Stade du Hameau (French pronunciation: [stad dy a.mo], formerly Stade Olympique du Hameau or Stade colonel de Fornel) is a multi-purpose stadium, as well as a sports and convention center in Pau, France. Built in 1948, the stadium has been the property of the city of Pau since 1983 after being handed over by the French army. The stadium is used mostly for rugby union matches, hosting the home games of French club Section Paloise.

With a capacity of 14,588 seats, after the disassembly of the Ossau tribune, the Hameau stadium has hosted since 1991 the rugby matches of the Section paloise, which had been held at the Croix du Prince stadium since 1910.

The first renovation of the Stade du Hameau was undertaken in 1988, when Section Paloise were forced to leave the historic Stade de la Croix du Prince. Pau FC were welcomed for a second lease in 1991.

Stade du Hameau was then completely transformed in 2017, and is now noted for its aestheticism. The roofing of the North and East stands draws a taut arc, and offers a new, slender and unified silhouette, while the curved and translucent shape of the leading edge of the awning brings lightness and elegance.

Pau FC left the Hameau in 2018, and now has its own stadium at Nouste Camp. However, the  football club had to return to the Hameau for a third temporary lease during the first half of the 2020-2021 season, while waiting for its new stadium to be brought up to Ligue 2 standards.

Finally, the Hameau also hosts sporting and cultural events, including the 2018–19 Pro D2 final.

Stade du Hameau is the largest stadium in Pyrénées-Atlantiques in terms of capacity, ahead of the Stade Jean-Dauger in Bayonne and the Parc des sports d'Aguiléra in Biarritz.

It is also the third largest stadium in the Nouvelle-Aquitaine region, behind the two Bordeaux stadiums of Matmut Atlantique and Chaban-Delmas.

Opening 
Stade du Hameau was built as a military stadium in order to accommodate the National Military Physical Training School that had to leave Paris at the beginning of WW2, at the initiative of Colonel de Fornel in 1948.

The inauguration took place after WW2, on 9 October 1949. René Lehmann, head of sports at L'Aurore estimated the stadium's capacity at 100,000 seats, describing the stadium as an "architectural marvel", drawing a parallel with the Stade Olympique Yves-du-Manoir, which was in desperate need of investment at the time.

Papa Gallo Thiam beat the French high jump record held by Georges Damitio that day with 1m99. The athletes Étienne Bally and Étienne Gailly were present, as well as André Mourlon who failed to better his record.

Colonel de Fornel died at the beginning of 1952 and the National Military Physical Training School was transferred to Antibes shortly afterwards.

In 1957, the stadium was renamed the Colonel de Fornel stadium, as an homage to its creator.

Development
In October 2015, François Bayrou, president of the Democratic Movement (MoDem) and mayor of Pau, presented plans for a renovation project with work starting March 2016 for delivery in September 2017. The Auchan Stand, now the new Teréga East Stand, was completely reworked to increase capacity from 2900 to 5500 seats while a completely new stand was built on the Northwest side of the field.

When finished, the stadium increased capacity from 14,000 to nearer 18,500, with the cost of the work estimated at €15m. In 2020, Bayrou will build the final stand which would complete the enclosure. The structure's new capacity has yet to be revealed.

On 22 February 2019, it hosted a Six Nations Under 20s Championship match between France and Scotland with France winning 42–27.

The stadium's record attendance was recorded in 2017, when 18 324  spectators watched the Top 14 clash between Section and Union Bordeaux Bègles.

Future expansion is likely to involve the addition of a new Tribune Ossau, which would raise the capacity to around 20,000.

Financial aspects

One of the most economical stadiums in France 
The renovation of Stade du Hameau makes it one of the most economical stadiums in France, with the cost of the works amounting to around 15 million euros, representing less than 2,000 € / seat. This budget should be compared with other similar projects in France, where the average price per seat is generally between €4,000 and €6,000 .

Initially estimated at 12 million euros, the renovation will have cost 15.6 million euros excluding tax, of which 2 million euros for the city of Pau, 8.1 million euros for the Pau urban community, 2.5 million euros for the region and 3 million euros for the department1.

Atmosphere 
The stadium has been described as one of the "most intimidating stadiums in world rugby".

Famous meetings

Athletics 
Papa Gallo Thiam beats the French high jump record held by Georges Damitio with a bar of 1m99, on 9 October 1949 at the inauguration of the stadium, and would go on to become the first Frenchman to cross 2m in the high jump.

Rugby League 
In November 1972, Great Britain, coached by Jim Challinor  beat New Zealand 43 to 13 in the 1972 Rugby League World Cup  in front of 8,000 spectators.

At that time the stadium, still a military stadium, had only one main stand, supplemented by removable bleachers.

Football 
In football, since the first renovation in 1988, AS Saint-Étienne, Nîmes Olympique, AS Cannes (then coached by Luis Fernandez) or Paris Saint-Germain (round of 16 of the 1997–98 Coupe de France and 2019–20 Coupe de France).

During Pau FC's run in the French Cup 2019-2020, the club played its 2 home matches against Ligue 1 teams, Girondins de Bordeaux and PSG, beating the attendance record in football configuration with 16700 people.

The France Espoirs team also played in the stadium, in a friendly match against Switzerland on 12 March 1997. Among the young French players present that day were Patrick Vieira, Thierry Henry and David Trezeguet.

Michel Platini also played at the Hameau on the occasion of Dominique Vésir's jubilee in 1988.

The Pau Football Club also played its home games there until 2018. Since the 2018-2019 season, it has been playing in a new stadium dedicated to football and located just a few hundred metres from the Hameau stadium.

Rugby Union 
Section Paloise is a historic club in French rugby with regular participation at the top of the pyramid of divisions, including the Top 16, then the Top 14. The best French teams therefore travel regularly to the Hameau.

In 2014, in front of 8,500 spectators, the French women's rugby team won the Grand Slam by beating Ireland in the last match of the Six Nations Tournament.

 Women's Six Nations Championship

The French women's rugby team received Ireland in a match of the Six Nations Women's Tournament in 2012 and 2014.

In 2020, England earned a hard-fought 19-13 victory over France at Stade du Hameau.

 Six Nations Under 20s Championship

In 2016, France under-20 beat England in a packed stadium.

On 22 February 2019, the Agglomeration will co-host a match of the Six Nations Rugby Under 20 Tournament between France, world champion, and Scotland.

European Rugby Cup

On 9 November 1997, Section paloise beat Leicester Tigers 35-18 in the quarter finals of the 1997–98 Heineken Cup.

Stadium name 
The stadium has known different names during its history. Inaugurated in 1949 as stade olympique du Hameau, the stadium was renamed Colonel de Fornel Stadium in honour of its creator in 1957. However, the name Stade du Hameau is the most frequently used.

In 2009, the President of Section Paloise Bernard Pontneau and Mayor Martine Lignières-Cassou investigated the possibility of naming the stadium after French international player and administrator Robert Paparemborde, who had died in 2001.  Lignières-Cassou said "I have only one wish, that this stadium will live up to the ambitions of the professional club and that its renovation will be completed by the emblematic name of Paparemborde".

References

Hameau
Rugby League World Cup stadiums
Hameau
Hameau
Sport in Pau, Pyrénées-Atlantiques
Pau FC
Sports venues in Pyrénées-Atlantiques
Sports venues completed in 1948